The Nastro d'Argento (Silver Ribbon) is a film award assigned each year, since 1946, by Sindacato Nazionale dei Giornalisti Cinematografici Italiani ("Italian National Syndicate of Film Journalists"), the association of Italian film critics.

This is the list of Nastro d'Argento awards for Best Actor. Marcello Mastroianni is the record holder with seven Nastro d'Argento awards for Best Actor received from 1955 to 1991, followed by Vittorio Gassman and Nino Manfredi, both four times winners.

1940s 
 1946 – Andrea Checchi – Due lettere anonime
 1947 – Amedeo Nazzari – The Bandit
 1948 – Vittorio De Sica – Heart
 1949 – Massimo Girotti – In the Name of the Law

1950s 
 1950 – not awarded
 1951 – Aldo Fabrizi – Prima comunione
 1952 – Totò – Cops and Robbers
 1953 – Renato Rascel – The Overcoat
 1954 – Nino Taranto – Easy Years
 1955 – Marcello Mastroianni – Days of Love
 1956 – Alberto Sordi – The Bachelor
 1957 – not awarded
 1958 – Marcello Mastroianni – White Nights
 1959 – Vittorio Gassman – Big Deal on Madonna Street

1960s 
 1960 – Alberto Sordi – The Great War
 1961 – Marcello Mastroianni – La Dolce Vita
 1962 – Marcello Mastroianni – Divorce, Italian Style
 1963 – Vittorio Gassman – The Easy Life
 1964 – Ugo Tognazzi – The Conjugal Bed
 1965 – Saro Urzì – Seduced and Abandoned
 1966 – Nino Manfredi – Questa volta parliamo di uomini
 1967 – Totò – The Hawks and the Sparrows
 1968 – Gian Maria Volonté – We Still Kill the Old Way
 1969 – Ugo Tognazzi – La bambolona

1970s 
 1970 – Nino Manfredi – Nell'anno del Signore
 1971 – Gian Maria Volonté – Investigation of a Citizen Above Suspicion
 1972 – Riccardo Cucciolla – Sacco e Vanzetti
 1973 – Giancarlo Giannini – The Seduction of Mimi
 1974 – Giancarlo Giannini – Love and Anarchy
 1975 – Vittorio Gassman – Scent of a Woman
 1976 – Michele Placido – Victory March
 1977 – Alberto Sordi – An Average Little Man
 1978 – Nino Manfredi – In the Name of the Pope King
 1979 – Flavio Bucci – Ligabue

1980s 
 1980 – Nino Manfredi – Café express
 1981 – Vittorio Mezzogiorno – Three Brothers
 1982 – Ugo Tognazzi – Tragedy of a Ridiculous Man
 1983 – Francesco Nuti – The Pool Hustlers
 1984 – Carlo Delle Piane – Una gita scolastica
 1985 – Michele Placido – Pizza connection
 1986 – Marcello Mastroianni – Ginger and Fred
 1987 – Roberto Benigni – Down by Law (in English language)
 1988 – Marcello Mastroianni – Dark Eyes
 1989 – Gian Maria Volonté – The Abyss  (in French language)

1990s 
 1990 – Vittorio Gassman – Lo zio indegno
 1991 – Marcello Mastroianni – Towards Evening
 1992 – Roberto Benigni – Johnny Stecchino
 1993 – Diego Abatantuono – Puerto Escondido
 1994 – Paolo Villaggio – The Secret of the Old Woods
 1995 – Alessandro Haber – La vera vita di Antonio H.
 1996 – Sergio Castellitto – The Star Maker
 1997 – Leonardo Pieraccioni – Il ciclone
 1998 – Roberto Benigni – Life Is Beautiful
 1999 – Giancarlo Giannini – La stanza dello scirocco

2000s 
 2000 – Silvio Orlando – I Prefer the Sound of the Sea
 2001 – Stefano Accorsi – The Ignorant Fairies
 2002 – Sergio Castellitto – My Mother's Smile
 2003
 Neri Marcorè – Incantato  
 Gigi Proietti – Febbre da cavallo - La mandrakata
 2004
 Alessio Boni, Fabrizio Gifuni, Luigi Lo Cascio, Andrea Tidona – The Best of Youth 
 Roberto Herlitzka – Good Morning, Night  
 2005 – Toni Servillo – The Consequences of Love
 2006 – Pierfrancesco Favino, Kim Rossi Stuart, Claudio Santamaria – Romanzo criminale
 2007 – Silvio Orlando – The Caiman
 2008 – Toni Servillo – La ragazza del lago
 2009 – Toni Servillo – Il Divo

2010s 
 2010
 Elio Germano – La nostra vita
 Christian De Sica – Il figlio più piccolo
 2011 – Kim Rossi Stuart – Vallanzasca - Gli angeli del male
 2012 – Pierfrancesco Favino – ACAB – All Cops Are Bastards and Piazza Fontana: The Italian Conspiracy
 2013 – Aniello Arena – Reality
 2014 – Fabrizio Bentivoglio and Fabrizio Gifuni – Human Capital
 2015 – Alessandro Gassmann – An Italian Name and The Dinner
 2016 – Stefano Accorsi – Italian Race
 2017 – Renato Carpentieri – Tenderness
 2018 – Marcello Fonte and Edoardo Pesce – Dogman
 2019 – Pierfrancesco Favino – The Traitor

2020s 
 2020 – Pierfrancesco Favino – Hammamet
 2021 – Kim Rossi Stuart – Everything's Gonna Be Alright (Cosa sarà)
 2022
Pierfrancesco Favino – Nostalgia
Silvio Orlando – The Inner Cage (Ariaferma) and Il bambino nascosto

See also 
 David di Donatello for Best Actor
 Cinema of Italy

References

External links 
 Italian National Syndicate of Film Journalists official site  

Nastro d'Argento
Film awards for lead actor